Newmarket Films, LLC was an American privately owned independent film production and distribution company and a former film distribution subsidiary of Newmarket Capital Group. The company produced such films as The Mexican, Cruel Intentions, and the Christopher Nolan films Memento and The Prestige. Newmarket distributed, in North America, such films as The Passion of the Christ, Whale Rider, Monster, Donnie Darko, and God Grew Tired of Us.

History
Newmarket Capital Group was founded in 1994 by Chris Ball and William Tyrer, with the company's executive team made up of Chris Calhoon, Rene Cogan, John Crye and Robert Fyvolent. The company was originally launched as a film financing company. Newmarket financed and produced films that had "break-out potential" and finance as small as $2 million and as large as $20 million. While financing and producing Memento, the company had trouble trying to find a distribution deal. Producer Aaron Ryder, who brought the film to Newmarket, decided to distribute it as a one-off project under Newmarket Films. Memento was a critical and commercial success, thus leading Newmarket Films to become a full theatrical distribution company.

Newmarket Films was acquired by Exclusive Media Group (which eventually became Exclusive Media) in 2009. In 2010, Newmarket made a deal with Lionsgate Home Entertainment to become the exclusive home entertainment distributor for Newmarket's film library. Later that year, Chris Ball left the company to form the distribution company Wrekin Hill Entertainment; Rene Cogan and John Crye joined him. Exclusive Media then sold its own film library, including the Newmarket library, to AMBI Group in 2015.

Filmography
As distributor

As financier/producer
 American Pie
 Anna Karenina
 A Better Way to Die
 Bound
 Cruel Intentions
 Cruel Intentions 2
 Cruel Intentions 3
 Dead Man
 Devour
 Different for Girls
 FairyTale: A True Story
 Felicia's Journey
 A Hole in My Heart
 The Importance of Being Earnest
 In Your Hands
 It's the Rage
 The King Is Alive
 The Loss of Sexual Innocence
 Mean Guns
 Memento (co-production with Summit Entertainment) (DVD distributed by Sony Pictures Home Entertainment)
 The Mexican
 Mrs Dalloway
 My Big Fat Greek Wedding
 My Family
 Open Hearts
 The Prestige
 Prom Night
 Rogue Trader
 S. Darko
 The Shooter
 Sidewalks of New York
 Silent Trigger
 A Simple Plan
 The Skulls
 The Skulls II
 The Skulls III
 Sliding Doors
 Splendor
 Stark Raving Mad (co-production with Summit Entertainment) (DVD distributed by Sony Pictures Home Entertainment)
 Stranger than Fiction
 Top Dog
 Topsy-Turvy
 The Usual Suspects
 Velvet Goldmine
 A Walk on the Moon
 The Whole Wide World
 Wrong Turn
 Y Tu Mamá También

See also
 Independent film

References

Film distributors of the United States
Film production companies of the United States
Entertainment companies based in California
Companies based in Los Angeles
Entertainment companies established in 1994
1994 establishments in California